Daisy Garcia Reyes is a Filipino beauty queen, film and television actress, singer, TV-host, politician and businesswoman. She was crowned Binibining Pilipinas World 1996. She earned the title as the Beauty Queen Diva. She is a former councilor in Pateros, Philippines.

Career
Reyes starred in films of various genre such as sexy films, drama films and comedy films. She starred in the critically acclaimed Carino Brutal with Rosanna Roces. She has also done movies with some of the biggest names in Philippine movies such as Rudy Fernandez in Palaban and Birador, Aga Muhlach in Hinahanap-hanap Kita, Lito Lapid in Lisensyado and Albert Martinez in Scorpio Nights 2.

She appeared in GMA-7's primetime series Legacy.

Reyes was also a recording artist with two albums under her belt. Reyes became one of the hosts of DOCTORS ON TV, aired on UNTV.

Beauty queen
At fifteen, Reyes won Mod Cerinas de Manila pageant. A year after, she tried her luck at Eat Bulaga!'s Beautiful Girl but failed to make it to the finals. While in college at Arellano University, she joined Miss Manila pageant placing Second Runner-up.
 
In 1995, Reyes joined Mutya ng Pilipinas and was awarded as Second Runner-up and Miss Friendship. She then assuamed the Mutya ng Pilipinas Expo-International title which gives her to right compete in Ecuador for the Miss Expo-International pageant, where she placed Fourth Runner-up. In 1996, she won the Binibining Pilipinas World title and was also awarded as Best in Long Gown. Reyes was awarded Miss Personality out of 89 contestants in Miss World held in India.

Personal life
She has  a daughter named Gabrielle Lauren.

She oversees two thriving businesses, Daisy Premium Papaya Soap and a Beauty Salon. She is also a councilor of Pateros.

Councilor Daisy Reyes is also a member of Team Ministries International.

Commercials
Panasonic 2121
Beer Na Beer
Hawk Shoes
Laguna Bel-Air
Toyota FX "Darna"
Goldilocks

Filmography

Television
FPJ's Ang Probinsyano (TV Series) (2015)
Oh My G! (TV Series) (2015)
Maalaala Mo Kaya
Krus II (2013)
Shorts (2012)
Tulay II (2011)
Parol (2010)
Titulo (2010)
Legacy (2012 TV series) (2012)
Alice Bungisngis and her Wonder Walis (TV series) (2012)
Wansapanataym
Laro Laro (2012)
Sinong-A-Ling-Dingdong (2011)
A Boy's Bestfriend (2011)
Mutya (TV series) (2011)
Debate With Mare At Pare - Beauty Or Brains? (2005)
Kung Mawawala Ka (TV series) (2001)
Munting Anghel (TV series) (2000)
Rio Del Mar (1998 TV series) (1998–2001)

Movies
Marital Rape (2001)
Parehas Ang Laban (2001) - David Valdez's wife
Lakas At Pag-ibig (2001)
Ping Lacson: Super Cop (2000)
Testigo (2000)
Waray (2000)
Palaban (2000)
Antonio Cuervo - Police: Walang Pinipili Ang Batas (2000)
Ako Ang Lalagot Sa Hininga Mo (1999)
Linlang (1999)
Kapag Kumulo Ang Dugo (1999)
Ms. Kristina Moran: Babaeng Palaban (1999)
'Di Puwedeng Hindi Puwede! (1999)
Dumating Ka Lang Ba Para Umalis (1999)
Hinahanap-Hanap Kita (1999)
Scorpio Nights 2 (1999)
Sa Piling Ng Iba (1998)
Hatiin Natin Ang Ligaya (1998)
Carino Brutal (1998)
Birador (1998)
Dr. X On The Air (1998)
Takaw Tukso (1998)
Walang Katapusang Init (1998)
Lisensyado (1998)
Huwag Na Huwag Kang Lalapit, Darling (1997)
Mga Liham Ni Alberto (1996)
Gayuma (1996)

Discography
She has been singing rock songs since twelve. Her first contest was Luha by Sakada. At thirteen, she was part of DZRH's Fiesta Caravan performing team of the late Ric Radam.

In 2002, she was offered a recording deal by Dyna Records giving her self-titled album, Tayo'y Magsayawan. She also formed a band called DAZE. Together with her band, Reyes has performed in various bars such as Bagaberde, Atchie's, Friends, Aruba and Metro Phi.

The recently released second album Ode To The Irony Of Love. The album is a whole new pop-rock-alternative which is composed of five original compositions, three revivals and two acoustic versions.

Ode to the Irony of Love - album
Give It To Me
Kind and Generous
Breaking Poing
I'll Never Be The One
Deadma
Tanong
Kailan
Tao
I'll Never Be The One (acoustic)
Tanong (acoustic)
AGE OF HIM

See also
Binibining Pilipinas
Mutya ng Pilipinas
Miss World Philippines
Philippines at major beauty pageants

References

External links
Daisy Reyes at Official Website

Living people
Binibining Pilipinas winners
1976 births
Filipino women comedians
People from Pateros
Actresses from Metro Manila
Metro Manila city and municipal councilors
Nacionalista Party politicians
Miss World 1996 delegates
Mutya ng Pilipinas winners